PBG Basket Poznań is a former professional basketball club from Poznań, Poland. The team was founded in 2006, intending to continue the basketball legacy of Lech Poznań. PBG played in the PLK for most of its existence, but withdrew in 2012.

Notable players
 Damian Kulig (2 seasons: '10–'12)

References

External links
 Official website

Defunct basketball teams in Poland
Sport in Poznań